Chhatian Union is a union parishad of Mirpur Upazila, in Kushtia District, Khulna Division of Bangladesh. There are 18 villages and 14 mouzas in the union.

References

External links
 

Unions of Khulna Division
Unions of Mirpur Upazila
Unions of Kushtia District